PartyNextDoor Two (stylized as PARTYNEXTDOOR TWO or P2) is the debut studio album by Canadian recording artist PartyNextDoor. It was released on July 29, 2014, by OVO Sound and Warner Records. The record was supported by the promotional singles: "Her Way" and "Recognize" featuring Drake, which were respectively released on June 13 and July 15, 2014.

Background
On July 14, 2014, PartyNextDoor announced that PartyNextDoor Two would be released on July 29, 2014 in the United States; it serves as the follow-up to his debut extended play PartyNextDoor (2013). The record was made available for pre-order through the iTunes Store the following day.

Critical reception

PartyNextDoor Two received mixed reviews from music critics. At Metacritic, which assigns a normalized rating out of 100 to reviews from mainstream publications, the album received an average score of 46, based on 5 reviews, which indicates "mixed or average reviews".

Commercial performance 
PartyNextDoor Two debuted at number 15 on the US Billboard 200 chart and number one on the US Top R&B Albumschart, selling 15,924 copies in its first week. On March 26, 2020, the album was certified gold by the Recording Industry Association of America (RIAA) for combined sales and album-equivalent units of over 500,000 units in the United States.

Track listing

Notes
  signifies a co-producer
 "Recognize" features background vocals by Bobby Chin and Willie Chin
 "Thirsty" features background vocals by Kalysha Adria Cain-Ling
 "FWU" is short for "Fuck With U"

Sample credits
 "East Liberty" contains a sample of "Know Where", as performed by Holy Other.
 "SLS" contains a sample of "Share My World", as performed by Dru Hill.
 "Sex on the Beach" contains samples of "Latch", written by Guy Lawrence, Howard Lawrence, Jimmy Napes,  Sam Smith and Jimmy Napes, as performed by Disclosure.
 "FWU" contains a sample of "The Champ", as performed by The Mohawks.
 "Thirsty" contains a sample of "Ching-a-Ling", as performed by Missy Elliott.
 "Muse" contains a sample of "Only When Ur Lonely", as performed by Ginuwine.

Personnel
Credits for PartyNextDoor Two adapted from AllMusic.

 Chris Athens – mastering
 Noel Cadastre – engineer
 Kalysha Adria Cain-Ling – background vocals
 Noel "Gadget" Campbell – mixing
 Bobby Chin – background vocals
 Willie Chin – background vocals
 Drake – featured artist
 Missy Elliott – composer
 Holy Other – composer
 Guy Lawrence – composer
 Howard Lawrence – composer
 Liam Macrae – photography
 Greg Morrison – mixing assistant
 Tim Mosley – composer
 Neenyo – drum programming, instrumentation, producer
 Nicky Orenstein – art direction, design
 PartyNextDoor – engineer, instrumentation, primary artist, producer
 Sean Seaton – composer, keyboards
 Noah "40" Shebib – engineer
 Sam Smith – composer
 Colin "Spenceselah" Spencer – mixing assistant
 Evan Stewart – assistant engineer
 Lindsay Warner – mixing assistant
 Chozen Williams – engineer

Charts

Weekly charts

Year-end charts

Certifications

Release history

References

2014 debut albums
Albums produced by PartyNextDoor
PartyNextDoor albums
OVO Sound albums
Warner Records albums